Sir George Wombwell, 1st Baronet (11 June 1734 – 2 November 1780) was Chairman of the Honourable East India Company and a Member of Parliament.

He was the son of Roger Wombwell of Glasgow, Scotland, a merchant. He went into partnership with his uncle in the London company of George Wombwell, sen. and jun. He was elected a director of the British East India Company in 1766–69, 1775–77 and chairman in 1777–79.

He was elected Member of Parliament (MP) for Huntingdon in 1774, sitting until 1780. He was created a baronet in 1778.

He married Susanna, the daughter of Sir Thomas Rawlinson, Lord Mayor of London. They had a son, Sir George Wombwell, 2nd Baronet, and two daughters.

References

 

1734 births
1780 deaths
Baronets in the Baronetage of Great Britain
Members of the Parliament of Great Britain for English constituencies
Directors of the British East India Company
British MPs 1774–1780